Stratford Garfield Kenlock  (born 16 April 1965) and often referred to by the first name of Mark, is a former English cricketer.  He was a left-handed batsman who bowled left-arm fast-medium.  He was born at Portland, Surrey County in Jamaica.

Kenlock made his first-class for Surrey (England) against Oxford University in 1994.  From 1994 to 1996, he represented the county in 7 first-class matches, the last of which came against South Africa A.  In his 7 first-class matches, he took 11 wickets at a bowling average of 60.54, with best figures of 3/104.

His debut in List A cricket for the county against Nottinghamshire in the 1994 AXA Equity and Law League.  From 1994 to 1995, he represented the county in 21 List A matches, the last of which came against Hampshire in the 1995 AXA Equity and Law League.  In his 21 List A matches for the county he took 30 wickets at a bowling average of 26.56, with a single five wicket haul which gave him best figures of 5/15.

Kenlock made his List A debut for the Surrey Cricket Board in 1999 against Norfolk and Cheshire in the 1999 NatWest Trophy.  He played a further match for the Board against Shropshire in the 2000 NatWest Trophy.

References

External links
Mark Kenlock at Cricinfo
Mark Kenlock at CricketArchive

1986 births
Living people
People from Portland Parish
English people of Jamaican descent
English cricketers
Surrey cricketers
Surrey Cricket Board cricketers